Chief Margaret Ekpo  (27 July 1914 – 21 September 2006) was a Nigerian women's rights activist and social mobilizer who was a pioneering female politician in the country's First Republic and a leading member of a class of traditional Nigerian women activists, many of whom rallied women beyond notions of ethnic solidarity. She played major roles as a grassroots and nationalist politician in the Eastern Nigerian city of Aba, in the era of a hierarchical and male-dominated movement towards independence.

Early life and education
Margaret Ekpo was born in Creek Town, Cross River State, to the family of Okoroafor Obiasulor [who was originally from Aguluzigbo, a rural town in Anaocha Local Government Area of Anambra State] and Inyang Eyo Aniemikwe. Through her mother, she was a member of the royal family of King Eyo Honesty II of Creek Town. She reached standard six of the school leaving certificate in 1934. However, her goals of further education in teachers training were put on hold after the death of her father in 1934. She then started working as a pupil-teacher in elementary schools. She married a doctor, John Udo Ekpo, in 1938.

He was from the Ibibio ethnic group, while she was of Igbo and Efik heritage. The couple later moved to Aba.

In 1946, she had the opportunity to study abroad at what is now Dublin Institute of Technology, Dublin Ireland. She earned a diploma in domestic science and on her return to Nigeria she established a Domestic Science and Sewing Institute in Aba. She was in the woman’s rights activist

Political career

Early politics
Margaret Ekpo's first direct participation in political ideas and association was in 1945. Her husband was indignant with the colonial administrators' treatment of indigenous Nigerian doctors but as a civil servant, he could not attend meetings to discuss the matter. Margaret Ekpo then attended meetings in place of her husband, the meetings were organized to discuss the discriminatory practices of the colonial administration in the city and to fight cultural and racial imbalance in administrative promotions. She later attended a political rally and was the only woman at the rally, which saw fiery speeches from Mbonu Ojike, Nnamdi Azikiwe and Herbert Macaulay. By the end of the decade she had organized a Market Women Association in Aba to unionize market women in the city. She used the association to promote women's solidarity as a platform to fight for the economic rights of women, economic protections and expansionary political rights of women. Ekpo's political career ended with the commencement of the Nigerian Civil War. At that time, she was detained by Biafran authorities for three years in prison with adequate feeding.

Activism 
Margaret Ekpo's awareness of growing movements for civil rights for women around the world prodded her into demanding the same for the women in her country and to fight the discriminatory and oppressive political and civil role colonialism played in the subjugation of women. She felt that women abroad including those in Britain, were already fighting for civil rights and had more voice in political and civil matters than their counterparts in Nigeria. She later joined the decolonization-leading National Council of Nigeria and the Cameroons (NCNC), as a platform to represent a marginalized group. In the 1950s, she also teamed up with Funmilayo Ransome-Kuti to protest killings at an Enugu coal mine; the victims were leaders protesting colonial practices at the mine. In 1953, Ekpo was nominated by the NCNC to the regional House of Chiefs, and in 1954 she established the Aba Township Women's Association. As leader of the new market group, she was able to garner the trust of a large number of women in the township and turn it into a political pressure group. By 1955, women in Aba had outnumbered male voters in a citywide election.

Margaret Ekpo won a seat to the Eastern Regional House of Assembly in 1961, a position that allowed her to fight for issues affecting women at the time. In particular, there were issues on the progress of women in economic and political matters, especially in the areas of transportation around major roads leading to markets and rural transportation in general.

Recognition 
After a military coup ended the First Republic, she took a less prominent approach to politics. In 2001, Calabar Airport was renamed Margaret Ekpo International Airport. She died 5 years later in 2006.

References

1914 births
2006 deaths
National Council of Nigeria and the Cameroons politicians
Nigerian women activists
People of Efik descent
20th-century Nigerian politicians
Nigerian women's rights activists
Igbo activists
20th-century Nigerian women politicians
20th-century Nigerian women
People from colonial Nigeria
Alumni of Dublin Institute of Technology
Nigerian suffragists